Magpie is a common name describing several genera of the bird family Corvidae.

Magpie may also refer to:

Animals

Other Birds
 Australian magpie, a medium-sized black and white passerine bird native to Australia and southern New Guinea

Butterflies and moths
 Magpie (butterfly), the milkweed butterfly Protoploea apatela from the New Guinea region
 Abraxas grossulariata, a moth in the family Geometridae, called the magpie in Great Britain and Ireland
 Eurrhypara hortulata, a moth in the family Pyralidae, called the small magpie in Great Britain and Ireland
 Nyctemera amicus, a moth in the family Arctiidae from south-east Asia and Australasia, sometimes called the magpie moth
 Nyctemera annulata, a moth in the family Arctiidae, called the magpie moth in New Zealand

Other animals
 Magpie cat, a bicolor cat with irregular black-and-white spotting
 Magpie perch or magpie morwong (Cheilodactylus nigripes, a fish of family Cheilodactylidae)

Places
 Magpie, a settlement in the municipality of Rivière-Saint-Jean, Quebec, Canada
 Magpie Creek, a stream in North Dakota, USA
 Magpie Lane, Oxford, a very narrow historic lane in central Oxford, England
 Magpie River (Ontario), Canada
 Magpie River (Quebec), Canada
 Magpie, Quebec, a community in Canada
 Magpie, Victoria, a suburb of Ballarat in Australia

Sports clubs

Australia
 Collingwood Magpies, an Australian Football League club
 Hay Magpies, a rugby league club based in the New South Wales town of Hay
 Port Adelaide Magpies, a South Australian National Football League club
 Souths Logan Magpies, a Queensland Cup club
 Western Suburbs Magpies, a NSWRL Premier League club
 Western Magpies Australian Football Club, an AFL Queensland State League club
 Western Suburbs Magpies AFC, an Australian rules football club in Sydney

United Kingdom
 Chorley F.C., an English football club
 Newcastle United F.C., an English football club
 Notts County F.C., an English football club
 Maidenhead United F.C., an English football club

Elsewhere
 F.C. Bruno's Magpies, a Gibraltar football club
 Rabat Ajax F.C., a Maltese football club
 New York Magpies, United States Australian Football League team
 Hawke's Bay (National Provincial Championship), a New Zealand rugby union team

Music
 Magpie Records, a British record label set up in 1976 by Bruce Bastin
 Magpie (folk duo), an American folk duo formed in the 1970s
 Magpie, an album by Stephen Fretwell

Songs
 "The Magpie", a Russian art song - see List of compositions by Modest Mussorgsky
 "Magpie", from the 2001 Death by Chocolate album Death by Chocolate by, based on the nursery rhyme "One for Sorrow"
 "Magpie", B-side of the 1994 single "Girls & Boys" by the English rock band Blur 
 "Magpie", on the album The Magic Position by Patrick Wolf
 "Morning Mr. Magpie", on the 2011 album The King of Limbs by the English band Radiohead
 "Magpie", a song by The Mountain Goats on their album The Sunset Tree
 "Magpie to the Morning", from the 2009 album Middle Cyclone by the American folk singer Neko Case
 "Magpie", from the 2015 album Mount the Air by The Unthanks, based on the nursery rhyme "One for Sorrow"

Other uses
 , eight Royal Navy ships
 MAGPIE, a pulsed-power generator based at Imperial College London
 MAgPIE, a scientific model for land and water use
 The Magpie (Monet) ("La Pie"), an 1869 painting by Monet
 Magpie (TV series), British children's television show, broadcast 1968–1980 on ITV
 Magpie (character), a kleptomaniac supervillain in the Batman series of comics
 Magpie, Carmarthen and Cardigan Railway steam locomotive built in 1861
 Magpie, a serif typeface designed by Vincent Connare
 Magpie, the magazine of the now defunct Paedophile Information Exchange (PIE)

See also
 "The Magpies", the most famous poem by New Zealand poet Denis Glover (1912–1980)
 The Other Magpie, a Native American woman who fought in the Black Hills War

Animal common name disambiguation pages